Sadia Yarardin Argueta Hernández (born 15 March 1984) is a Honduran politician. She currently serves as deputy of the National Congress of Honduras representing the Christian Democratic Party of Honduras for Cortés.

References

1984 births
Living people
Christian Democratic Party of Honduras politicians
Deputies of the National Congress of Honduras
People from Cortés Department
21st-century Honduran women politicians
21st-century Honduran politicians